Lago di Sorapiss (Italian: Lago di Sorapiss; German: Sorapissee) is a lake in the mountain range Sorapiss in the Dolomites, province of Belluno, c. 12 km away from Cortina d'Ampezzo. The lake has an altitude of 1,925 metres (6,316 ft.) above sea level.

The strong turquoise color is dust from the glacier. The lake can only be reached by foot or by helicopter. The hiking trail has a length of 10.5 km and takes 1.5 hours one way starting from Passo tre Croci.

Gallery

See also 
List of lakes in Italy#Alphabetical

External links

References

Lakes of Veneto
Geography of Cortina d'Ampezzo